Stover is the leaves and stalks of field crops.

Stover may also refer to:

Places
Stover, Missouri
Stover, West Virginia
Stover, Teigngrace, an historic estate in Devon, England
Stover Canal, a canal in Devon, England
Ralph Stover State Park, Bucks County, Pennsylvania State Park

People
Anthony Stover (born 1990), American basketball player
Charles B. Stover (1861–1929), Parks Commissioner for New York City
D.C. Stover (1839–1908), American industrialist
Dan Stover (born 1951), U.S. public educator, who ran as a Democrat
David Stover (born 1979), former NASCAR driver
Ida Elizabeth Stover (1862–1946), lifelong pacifist, mother of U.S. President Dwight David Eisenhower.
Jeff Stover, defensive lineman for the San Francisco 49ers
Leon Stover (1929–2006), anthropologist, Sinologist, and writer
Matt Stover (born 1968), NFL kicker, formerly with the Baltimore Ravens and Indianapolis Colts
Matthew Stover (born 1962), U.S. fantasy novelist 
Patrick J. Stover (born 1964), American nutritionist

Other uses
Stover at Yale, a 1912 novel by Owen Johnson
Russell Stover Candies, a U.S. supplier of boxed candy